In mathematics, precisely in the theory of functions of several complex variables, a pluriharmonic function is a real valued function which is locally the real part of a holomorphic function of several complex variables. Sometimes  such a function is referred to as n-harmonic function, where n ≥ 2 is the dimension of the complex domain where the function is defined. However, in modern expositions of the theory of functions of several complex variables it is preferred to give an equivalent formulation of the concept, by defining pluriharmonic function a complex valued function whose restriction to every complex line is a harmonic function with respect to the real and imaginary part of the complex line parameter.

Formal definition
. The function  is called pluriharmonic if, for every complex line

formed by using every couple of complex tuples , the function

is a harmonic function on the set

. Let  be a complex manifold and  be a  function. The function  is called pluriharmonic if

Basic properties
Every pluriharmonic function is a harmonic function, but not the other way around. Further, it can be shown that for holomorphic functions of several complex variables the real (and the imaginary) parts are locally pluriharmonic functions. However a function being harmonic in each variable separately does not imply that it is pluriharmonic.

See also
Plurisubharmonic function
Wirtinger derivatives

Notes

Historical references
.
 .
.
. Notes from a course held by Francesco Severi at the Istituto Nazionale di Alta Matematica (which at present bears his name), containing appendices of Enzo Martinelli, Giovanni Battista Rizza and Mario Benedicty. An English translation of the title reads as:-"Lectures on analytic functions of several complex variables – Lectured in 1956–57 at the Istituto Nazionale di Alta Matematica in Rome".

References
. The first paper where a set of (fairly complicate) necessary and sufficient conditions for the solvability of the Dirichlet problem for holomorphic functions of several variables is given. An English translation of the title reads as:-"About a boundary value problem".
."Boundary value problems for pluriharmonic functions" (English translation of the title) deals with boundary value problems for pluriharmonic functions: Fichera proves a trace condition for the solvability of the problem and reviews several earlier results of Enzo Martinelli, Giovanni Battista Rizza and Francesco Severi.
. An English translation of the title reads as:-"Boundary values of pluriharmonic functions: extension to the space R2n of a theorem of L. Amoroso".
. An English translation of the title reads as:-"On a theorem of L. Amoroso in the theory of analytic functions of two complex variables".
.
, available at Gallica
, available at Gallica
, available at DigiZeitschirften.

External links

Harmonic functions
Several complex variables